ODC may refer to:

 ODC/Dance, a San Francisco-based dance company
 Open Data Charter, concerning governmental open data
 Open Data Commons, a set of legal tools for open data
 Ordinary Decent Criminal (slang), used by Irish police force
 Ornithine decarboxylase, an enzyme
 Orthogonal Defect Classification
 Organic Disease Control, in aeroponics
 Office of Defense Cooperation